Glenn Murray (born November 23, 1970) is a former outfielder from Manning, S.C., who made his Major League Baseball debut in 1996 with the Philadelphia Phillies. In his debut with the Philadelphia Phillies he collected his first hit against the Atlanta Braves.

After playing 38 games he collected 19 hits with 2 home runs and 6 runs batted in.

Career
Glenn Murray was drafted in the second round of the 1989 free-agent draft by the Montreal Expos. After spending several seasons in the Expos minor league system, Murray was traded by Montreal to the Red Sox on March 23, 1994 for Derek Vineyard. Murray's stay in the Red Sox organization lasted until January 1996 when the Boston Red Sox sent him, with Ken Ryan and Lee Tinsley, to the Philadelphia Phillies for Rick Holyfield, Heathcliff Slocumb and Larry Wimberly.

Glenn Murray's last major league game came on July 24, 1996. In October of that season, Murray was claimed on waivers by the Cincinnati Reds.

On May 20, 1998, Glenn Murray was part of an unusual feat in baseball while playing for AAA Indianapolis Indians in a game against Pawtucket. In the 5th inning of the game, Pete Rose Jr. hit a solo home run, Jason Willims hit a 3-run home run, Murray added a grand slam, and Guillermo Garcia completed the "homer cycle" with a 2-run shot. The Indians won the game, 11-4.

In 1999, Murray joined the Nashua Pride of the Atlantic League. He stayed there until 2006, the year that Nashua switched to the Can-Am League, though he began the 2001 and 2002 seasons in the Mexican League. In 2003 in Nashua, he bat .252 with 23 home runs and 67 RBI.  In 2005 in Nashua, he bat .265 with 31 home runs and 98 RBI. In 477 games with Nashua, he has hit .275 with 106 home runs and 358 RBI.

In 1,529 career games in the minor leagues, Murray has hit .255 with 275 home runs, 923 RBI, and 197 stolen bases.

External links

1970 births
Living people
American expatriate baseball players in Mexico
Arkansas Travelers players
Baseball players from South Carolina
Bridgeport Bluefish players
Chattanooga Lookouts players
Gulf Coast Expos players
Harrisburg Senators players
Indianapolis Indians players
Jamestown Expos players
Leones de Yucatán players
Major League Baseball outfielders
Mexican League baseball first basemen
Mexican League baseball left fielders
Mexican League baseball right fielders
Nashua Pride players
Pawtucket Red Sox players
People from Manning, South Carolina
Piratas de Campeche players
Philadelphia Phillies players
Rockford Expos players
Scranton/Wilkes-Barre Red Barons players
West Palm Beach Expos players